Ana! Live in Amsterdam is Ana Popović's first concert video and live album, with the video released on May 31, 2005, and the album released on July 26, 2005. The album is not pure blues but showcases modern and cross-border blues with rock, soul, and jazz elements. "Sittin' on Top of the World" is a classic Chicago blues track, "Bigtown Playboy" showcases her slide guitar skills, "Won't Let You Down" gives off the funk and soul of Sade, and "Navojo Moon" is dedicated to the guitarists who influenced her style, such as Stevie Ray Vaughan and Ronnie Earl. Although Popović was born in Belgrade, Serbia, she had moved to Europe and had adopted Amsterdam as her new home, so this concert was presented in her new hometown.

Video track list

Video personnel

Musicians
 Ana Popović – vocals, guitar, slide guitar
 Fabrice Ach – bass
 Denis Palatin – drums
 Dominique Vantomme –  piano
 Angela Strehli – vocals (track 8)

Production
 Thomas Ruf - Executive producer
 Ronald Trijber - mixing and mastering
 Recorded live on January 30, 2005 in Amsterdam, NL at Melkweg

Album track list

Album personnel

Musicians
 Ana Popović – vocals, guitar, slide guitar
 Fabrice Ach – bass
 Denis Palatin – drums
 Dominique Vantomme –  piano
 Angela Strehli – vocals (track 8)

Production
 Thomas Ruf - Executive producer
 Ronald Trijber - mixing and mastering
 Recorded live on January 30, 2005 in Amsterdam, NL at Melkweg

References

2005 live albums
Ana Popović albums
Live video albums